The 2005 South American Ski Mountaineering Championship was the first edition of a South American continental championship of competition ski mountaineering,

The event, which was carried out in combination with the last race of the South American Ski Mountaineering Cup race and the "2nd International Open" event at San Carlos de Bariloche from 26 to 27 August 2009, was organized by the Federación Argentina de Ski y Andinismo (FASA) and the Club Andino Bariloche (CAB). It was officially sanctioned by the International Council for Ski Mountaineering Competitions (ISMC), by the Unión Panamericana de Montaña y Escalada (UPAME), by the Federación Española de Deportes de Montaña y Escalada (FEDME) and by the Escuela Militar de Montaña, the mountain warfare school of the Argentine Army.

The competitors came from Argentina and Chile, and also two male racers from Spain, one from Italy and one from Switzerland in the framework of the "International Open of Ski Mountaineering".

Results 
Event was held on the Cerro Catedral on August 27, 2005. The European participants (italic in the men's ranking list below) did not count in the continental championship ranking, but appeared in the "International Open" ranking.

List of the best 10 participants by gender:

References 

2005
South American Ski Mountaineering Championship
S
South American Ski Mountaineering Championship
Sport in Río Negro Province
Skiing in Argentina